La belle province may refer to:
"La belle province" ("the beautiful province"), a nickname for Quebec, a French-speaking province in Eastern Canada
La Belle Province (restaurant), a fast-food chain based in Quebec
The motto on Vehicle registration plates of Quebec prior to 1978 (the current motto is Je me souviens ("I remember"))